Kenneth James Gaines (born January 28, 1994) is an American former professional basketball player who currently serves as a graduate assistant coach for the Georgia Bulldogs of the Southeastern Conference (SEC).

High school
Gaines attended Whitefield Academy, in Atlanta, Georgia, where he played basketball.

College career
Gaines played NCAA Division I college basketball at the University of Georgia, where he played with the Georgia Bulldogs from 2012 to 2016. In his senior year, he averaged 12.8 points and 2.9 rebounds per game.

After going undrafted in the 2016 NBA draft, he joined the Houston Rockets for the 2016 NBA Summer League. In five games, he averaged 7.4 points and 2 rebounds in 13.4 minutes.

Professional career
Gaines started his professional career on August 16, 2016, by signing with Antibes Sharks of the French LNB Pro A. On November 30, 2017, he signed a two-year (1+1) deal with BC Juventus of the Lithuanian Basketball League. He won the LKL Slam Dunk Contest in 2018.

On July 17, 2019, Gaines signed with Bertram Tortona of the Italian Serie A2 Basket. On January 31, 2020, he parted ways with the team.

On February 18, 2020, Gaines signed with Latina Basket of the Serie A2 Basket until the end of the season.

Coaching career
On August 1, 2022, Gaines returned to Georgia Bulldogs as a graduate assistant.

References

External links
Kenny Gaines at eurobasket.com
Kenny Gaines at nbadraft.net
Georgia Bulldogs bio
Kenny Gaines stats at RealGM.com

1994 births
Living people
American expatriate basketball people in France
American expatriate basketball people in Italy
American expatriate basketball people in Lithuania
American men's basketball players
Basketball players from Atlanta
BC Juventus players
Georgia Bulldogs basketball players
Olympique Antibes basketball players
Parade High School All-Americans (boys' basketball)
Shooting guards